Antoine Duhamel (30 July 1925 – 11 September 2014) was a French composer, orchestra conductor and music teacher.

Life and career 
Born in Valmondois in the Val-d'Oise département of France, Antoine Duhamel was one of the three sons of the French writer Georges Duhamel and actress Blanche Albane. He studied music at the Sorbonne. He was a pupil of René Leibowitz, an exponent of Arnold Schoenberg’s dodecaphonic and serial method of composing. Together with other Leibowitz pupils, Serge Nigg, André Casanova and Jean Prodromidès, he gave the first performance of Leibowitz's Explications des Metaphors, Op. 15, in Paris in 1948. In 2002 he was awarded the Silver Bear at the Berlin Film Festival for his music for the Bertrand Tavernier directed film, Laissez-passer.

Duhamel scored several of Jean-Luc Godard's films, including Pierrot le Fou and Week End. He died at the age of 89 in September 2014.

Partial filmography 
 1963 : Méditerranée
 1964 : The Pit and the Pendulum
 1965 : Pierrot le Fou
 1966 : Trap for the Assassin
 1966 : La Longue marche
 1966: La Voleuse
 1967 : The Sailor from Gibraltar
 1967 : Weekend
 1968 : Stolen Kisses
 1969 : Mississippi Mermaid
 1970 : Bed and Board
 1970 : The Cop
 1973 : Frank en Eva
 1978 : The Song of Roland
 1979 : Mais ou et donc Ornicar
 1979 : Return to the Beloved
 1980 : Death Watch
 1989 : El sueño del mono loco
 1994 : La Piste du télégraphe
 1996 : Ridicule
 1998 : The Girl of Your Dreams
 2002 : Safe Conduct

See also 
Gravel Pit

References

External links 
 
 Alfred Duhamel French language Wikipedia article

1925 births
2014 deaths
People from Val-d'Oise
French film score composers
French male film score composers
University of Paris alumni
20th-century French musicians
20th-century French male musicians